The 1983 Cincinnati Bearcats football team represented the University of Cincinnati during the 1983 NCAA Division I-A football season. The Bearcats, led by first-year head coach Watson Brown, participated as independent and played their home games at Riverfront Stadium.  On-Campus Nippert Stadium was used as a supplement.

Cincinnati was relegated to NCAA Division I-AA for the 1983 season as outlined in this link:

1/26/1983 Cincinnati Enquirer Editorial

Schedule

Game Films
1983 Cincinnati - Penn State Football Game Film
1983 Cincinnati - Rutgers Football Game

References

Cincinnati
Cincinnati Bearcats football seasons
Cincinnati Bearcats football